The Watch is a 2008 made for TV movie starring Clea DuVall, James A. Woods, and Elizabeth Whitmere.

Plot
The movie opens with 7 year old Cassie in her bed sleeping. She wakes up hearing a scary noise and sees something at her closet and goes to investigate. When she sees nothing she closes the door only to turn around to see a woman dressed in white holding a teddy bear. Cassie is drugged and kidnapped. When she wakes up she is in a dark basement. She screams for help for two days, but no one comes. Finally 2 days later the police arrive arrest the woman and free Cassie. The movie then flicks to 20 years later, Cassie is now attending graduate school.  When she fails to hand in her thesis on time, her professor warns her she only has a month to finish it, so she takes a job as a fire look-out, a job she hopes will give her nothing else to do except finish the thesis.  However, the isolation preys on her and when she discovers that her only human contact, a voice on the radio, is apparently a dead girl, she wants out.  Meanwhile, her best friend starts to figure that someone is using Cassie's psychological profile against her.

Production
The film was directed by Jim Donovan and produced by Matt LeBlanc . The movie was released in March, 2008 on the Lifetime Movie Network. It was written by Ben Ripley.

External links
 
 Movies Released in 2010.

Canadian thriller television films
2008 television films
2008 films
Films directed by Jim Donovan
English-language Canadian films
2000s Canadian films